The Turcilingi (also spelled Torcilingi or Thorcilingi) were an obscure barbarian people, or possibly a clan or dynasty, who appear in historical sources relating to Middle Danubian peoples who were present in Italy during the reign of Romulus Augustulus (475–76). Their only known leader was Odoacer (Odovacar), but he was described as a ruler of several ethnic groups.

Although various origins have been proposed including Hunnic, recent research favors the idea that the Turcilingi might be identical to the Thuringii, who are first mentioned in association with a type of horse, known to the Romans but became politically important only after the fall of Odoacar.

Primary sources
The Turcilingi are mentioned in only one independent source: they appear three times in the works of Jordanes, twice in his Getica and once in his Romana. They are also mentioned once in the Historia Langobardorum of Paul the Deacon in a passage that is a derivative of Jordanes and once in the Historia Miscella of Landolfus Sagax in a passage derived from Paul. Johann Kaspar Zeuss, followed by Karl Müllenhoff, believed that the 'Ρουτίχλειοι (Routikleioi) mentioned in the Geographia of Ptolemy (II.11.7) were the Turcilingi, but this thesis requires a complex etymology. Landulf Sagax lists them together with the Sciri among the nations which participated on the side of Attila and the Huns at the Battle of the Catalaunian Plains.

Jordanes speaks of the Turcilingi, though he makes no mention of them at Châlons. The Turcilingi were joined with several other barbarian tribes, like the Sciri, Rugii, and Heruli, under Odoacer as foederati of the Western Roman Emperor Romulus Augustulus, who was a puppet of his father, Flavius Orestes. The barbarians demanded from Orestes in return for their military service some Italian land on which to settle. They were denied. According to Jordanes:

When Theodoric the Great was looking for a pretext to invade Italy in 493, he petitioned the Eastern Roman Emperor Zeno by reminding him of the "tyranny" (unlawful rule) of the city of Rome by Turcilingi and Rugii. According to Jordanes, Theodoric gave the following justification:

Reynolds and Lopez note that Jordanes consistently writes the word often translated as "Rugii", the name of a Middle Danubian Germanic people, with an "o" and not a "u" when referring to Odoacer. They compare the third mention, in the Romana (344) which describes him as "genere Rogus" which could be read as "offspring of a person named Rogus". Reynolds and Lopez connect this to the fact that Rogus was recorded as the name of an uncle of Attila, and point out that "regis Torcilingorum Rogorumque", though it looks like it refers to two tribes, is notable for not referring to any of the better-known peoples Odoacer is normally associated with ruling, such as the Sciri or Heruli, and propose that Odoacer is being described by Jordanes as a "Torcilingi-king, of the stock of Rogus, with Sciri and Herul followers".

Fredegar, writing in the middle of the 7th century, cites the Torci as living in eastern Europe. Claude Cahen argued that these were a remnant of the Turcilingi.

Paul the Deacon, in his opening chapter, names several peoples (Vandals, Rugii, Heruli, Turcilingi) who have come, he says, from Germania to Italy. He goes on to name the Lombards as latecomers from the same region. This passage is clearly based on Jordanes, but its reference to Germany is unique. Nonetheless, Paul does not say that the Turcilingi are Germans, but only where they came from: "The Goths indeed, and the Wandals, the Rugii, Heroli, and Turcilingi, and also other fierce and barbarous nations have come from Germany."

Identification
From the sources it is not possible to infer the origin of Turcilingi. 

The Turcilingi are generally considered to have been a Germanic tribe. By one 19th century account, the Turcilingi appear to have originated in Germany, perhaps near the Baltic Sea, and thence moved with the Huns into Gaul and finally to the Danube, possibly Noricum, before entering Italy with Odoacer. It was often assumed that they were an Eastern Germanic people related to the Sciri, or at least connected to the Sciri by special affinity. Nineteenth-century German scholarship thus supposed that the Turcilingi were neighbours of (or the same people as) the Sciri in the first century, or that they were the royal clan of the Sciri or the Huns. The more enthusiastic invented a homeland for them straddling the Oder, with the Sciri to the east, the Vandals to the west, and the Rugii to the north. These scholars placed them in the Gothic mouvance. 

More recently, Herwig Wolfram has continued to classify the Turcilingi as a Germanic tribe, and supports the notion that they were the royal clan of the Sciri. 

Still more recently, they have been identified with the Thuringii by Wolfram Brandes and Helmut Castritius, and this conclusion has begun to gain more acceptance, including Walter Pohl and Peter Heather. The reasoning is based on upon the facts that the Suda describes Odoacer's brother Onoulphus as a Thuringian on his father's side and Scirian on his mother's. The Thuringian identity of Odoacer's father is denied in the Prosopography of the Later Roman Empire. Hyun Jin Kim thinks the Suda contains a hypercorrection by a scribe who did not recognise the Turcilingi. Jordanes refers to both peoples.

Kim argues that they were "a Turkic-speaking tribe under Hunnic rule ... probably of mixed origin ... with possibly a Germanic and Turkic (Hunnic) mixture." Cahen, too, argued they were Turkic-speaking Huns.

Etymology
The problem of identification is related to the problem of etymology. Both are related to the question whether the Turcilingi were Germanic or not. The root Turci- has led some scholars to suggest that they were a Turkic-speaking tribe. The -ling suffix is Germanic, denoting members of a line, usually one descended from a common ancestor. Kim believes the name is a Germanization of Turkic name.

References

Sources

Cahen, Claude (1973). "Frédegaire et les Turcs". In Économies et sociétés au Moyen Âge: mélanges offerts à Édouard Perroy. Paris, pp. 24–27.
Goffart, Walter A. (1980). Barbarians and Romans, A.D. 418–584: The Techniques of Accommodation. Princeton, New Jersey: Princeton University Press. .
Jordanes. The Origins and Deeds of the Goths. Charles C. Mierow, trans. Last modified 22 April 1997.

McBain, Bruce (1983). "Odovacer the Hun?" Classical Philology, 78:4 (Oct.), pp. 323–327.
MacGeorge, Penny (2002). Late Roman Warlords. Oxford: Oxford University Press. .

Paul the Deacon (1907). Historia LangobardorumIV.xlii William Dudley Foulke, trans.

Ancient peoples of Europe
Iron Age peoples of Europe
Migration Period